David R. Nalin (born April 21, 1941) is an American physiologist, and Pollin Prize for Pediatric Research and Prince Mahidol Award, a.k.a. Mahidol Medal  winner.  Nalin had the key insight that oral rehydration therapy (ORT) would work if the volume of solution patients drank matched the volume of their fluid losses, and that this would drastically reduce or completely replace the only current treatment for cholera, intravenous therapy. Nalin led the trials that first demonstrated ORT works, both in cholera patients, and more significantly, also in other dehydrating diarrhea illnesses.   Nalin's discoveries have been estimated to have saved over 50 million lives worldwide.

Discovery of Oral Rehydration Therapy
In the fall of 1968, Dr. David Nalin, at a young 26 years of age and having completed only his first year of medical residency, was working in Dacca, Bangladesh at the Pakistan-SEATO Cholera Research Lab when a cholera epidemic broke out near Chittagong, along the eastern Burmese border. Until the discovery of ORT, the only efficient means of rehydrating a patient suffering from serious dehydration was to provide fluids intravenously. For the vast majority of people in the developing world, cholera or any severe diarrhea illness was too often a death sentence since people infected usually had no recourse due to the cost and inaccessibility of IV therapy.

Indian scientist Hemendra Nath Chatterjee first formulated and demonstrated the effectiveness of Orally Rehydrated Saline (ORS) for diarrhea management.  His paper regarding this finding was published in Lancet of November 1953.  In that paper he states that Avomine can stop vomiting during cholera and then oral rehydration is possible. The formulation of the fluid replacement solution  was 4 g of sodium chloride, 25 g of glucose and 1000 ml of water.

Adopting the research of H. N. Chatterjee, Nalin realized that ORT treatment could completely replace IV treatment and could work for most diarrhea, not only that caused by cholera.  Nalin and his colleague, Richard A. Cash, working in an adverse research climate, working in a tent housing patient overflow, at a small missionary hospital carved out of the jungle, fought to perform scientific trials that would prove Oral rehydration therapy would work. 
UNICEF released a special report in 1987 regarding Oral Rehydration Therapy.  It said “No other single medical breakthrough of the 20th century has had the potential to prevent so many deaths over such a short period of time and at so little cost” 

ORT is extremely effective and can easily be applied at home rather than in a hospital, but the idea and formulation for this elegant solution was time consuming and challenging - the formula needed to contain not only water, not only salt and water, but water, salt and sugar in very specific ratios. This solution has saved millions of lives since its inception 40 years ago.

The English medical journal, The Lancet, calls ORT “potentially the most important medical advance of this century." Since the adoption of this inexpensive and easily applied intervention, the worldwide mortality rate for children with acute infectious diarrhea has plummeted from 5 million to about 1.3 million deaths per year. Over fifty million lives have been saved in the past 40 years by the implementation of ORT.

Honors and recognition
Among many distinctions of his career, in November 2002 Nalin received the first ever Pollin Prize in Pediatric Research.  This honor was shared with Dr Norbert Hirshchhorn, Dr Dilip Mahalanabis, and Dr Nathaniel Pierce. In January 2007 the Mahidol Medal from His Royal Highness the King of Thailand was presented at a ceremony at the Chakri Throne Hall in Bangkok, in recognition of the discovery and implementation of Oral Rehydration Therapy.

Quotes about the Science and Scientist, David Nalin
“No other single medical breakthrough of the 20th century has had the potential to prevent so many deaths over such a short period of time and at so little cost” - UNICEF 1987

“Potentially the most important medical advance of this century." – The Lancet

“Which medicine has saved more lives than any other and can be made by anyone in their kitchen, back bedroom, shantytown hut or dwelling built of sticks – as long as they have access to clean water?  The answer is:  eight teaspoons of sugar, half a teaspoon of salt and one litre of water.  Mix.  Drink……It requires no specialized equipment; uses ingredients that are ubiquitous and have a long shelf life; has few side effects; and can be made up in any quantity – the prefect medicine.”  - Jeremy Laurance, British Journalist

In October 2006, The Independent, A British newspaper, reported on the greatest achievements in medical science in 150 years.  The second on their list was oral rehydration therapy (first was oral contraception).

Science of ORT

Many members of the research team responsible for the discovery of ORT had not yet completed their medical residencies. At the time there was a military draft in the U.S. and many medical students joined the U.S. Public Health Service, including the National Institutes of Health, Bethesda, MD, and the Centers for Disease Control's Epidemiological Intelligence Service, where some were shipped overseas to do research or offer medical care.

Every letter which went through the Bangladesh post office from 1993-1994 was stamped with a printed rhyme.  Translated into English, it read (gur is a molasses):
Mix with much care,
Good water, a liter,
A pinch of salt with a fistful of gur,
Remove the menace for good.

Stomach acid provides a natural defense against cholera infestation.  Researchers gave billions of bacteria to healthy individuals and none of them became ill, except when subjects were given an antacid.  This decrease in stomach acid immediately made them susceptible to cholera.

If ORT were applied to all patients who needed it, some estimate an additional two million lives could be saved annually and global savings in healthcare from home use of ORT would reach $10–15 billion US each year.

500 million packs of the oral rehydration solution are used each year in more than 60 developing countries.

A person with cholera can lose up to 20 liters a day of water, 10-20% of their body weight, leading to death by dehydration.

Gatorade works based on the same physiological mechanisms as ORT, however, it is NOT a substitute for ORT in diarrhea cases because it is formulated for healthy athletes, chiefly to replace sweat loss, not for sick children or adults who have diarrhea, which is significantly different in composition, and which requires a different solution. In order to make it easier for busy Americans to take, Abbot Laboratories created a ready mixed ORT drink for diarrhea, available in a bottle, called Pedialyte.

Timeline
1941 - David Nalin born in New York City.
1957 - David Nalin graduated from the Bronx High School of Science.
1965 - David Nalin graduated from Albany Medical College.
1967 - David Nalin arrived in Dhaka (the capital of East Pakistan, as Bangladesh was known. before gaining independence) to do cholera research at the Pakistan-SEATO Cholera. Research Laboratory (CRL) as a research associate at the US National Institutes of Health (NIH). 
1967 - David Nalin discovers that oral therapy can work to rehydrate cholera patients.  Collaborates with Richard A. Cash to develop trial protocol to confirm discovery success. 
1973 - Dr Nalin established and served at the Johns Hopkins Center for Medical Research in Dhaka, Bangladesh.
1975 - the World Health Organization (WHO) and the United Nations Children’s Fund (UNICEF) agreed to promote a single, orally administered solution of oral rehydration salts to prevent dehydration caused by diarrhea.
1979 - Dr. Nalin arrived in Lahore, Pakistan, to take charge of the malaria research centre, where he was later expelled by Pakistani authorities early in 1982 due to unfounded Soviet allegations that the research being conducted there was for the CIA
1983 to 2002 - Director of Clinical Research International, later Director of Vaccine Scientific Affairs at Merck’s Vaccine Division.
2002 - Dr. Nalin received the first ever Pollin Prize in Pediatric Research.
2007 - Dr. Nalin received the Mahidol Medal from His Royal Highness the King of Thailand, presented at a ceremony at the Chakri Throne Hall in Bangkok.

Books and publications 
Dr. David Nalin has published over 120 peer-reviewed academic papers, spanning his work over 40 years.  Some highlights include:

Oral maintenance therapy for cholera in adults.  Nalin DR, Cash RA, Islam R, Molla M, Phillips RA.  Lancet. 1968 Aug 17;2(7564):370-3.
This paper in The Lancet is the original report of Dr. Nalin and colleagues’ work with ORT.

Oral or nasogastric maintenance therapy in pediatric cholera patients.  Nalin DR, Cash RA.
J Pediatr. 1971 Feb;78(2):355-8.
This paper describes the use of ORT in pediatric patients.

Worldwide experience with the CR326F-derived inactivated hepatitis A virus vaccine in pediatric and adult populations: an overview.  Nalin DR, Kuter BJ, Brown L, Patterson C, Calandra GB, Werzberger A, Shouval D, Ellerbeck E, Block SL, Bishop R, et al.  
J Hepatol. 1993;18 Suppl 2:S51-5.
This paper describes Dr. Nalin’s work with Hepatitis A vaccine.

Mumps, measles, and rubella vaccination and encephalitis.  Nalin DR.  BMJ. 1989 Nov 11;299(6709):1219.

Oral therapy for diarrheal diseases.  Nalin DR.  J Diarrhoeal Dis Res. 1987 Dec;5(4):283-92.
This paper provides an overview of how ORT can be used for dehydration resulting from diarrheal diseases, not only cholera.

Recognition and treatment of anthrax.  Nalin DR.  JAMA. 1999 Nov 3;282(17):1624-5.

Books published by the scientist
Displaying Many Faces: Art and Gandharan Identity Selections from the David R. Nalin Collection by Chandreyi Basu, David Robert Nalin January 2004

External links
ScienceHeroes.com
Dr. Nalin’s biography as the recipient of the Prince Mahidol award
Against the Odds – Making a difference in global health – A Simple Solution

References

1941 births
Living people
American agnostics
American physiologists
Jewish scientists
American expatriates in Bangladesh
American expatriates in Pakistan